Abadan Faridoon Abadan (1946 - ?) is a former Provincial Minister of Balochistan and the ex-owner of Quetta Distilleries. He has been missing since 2002.

Politics 
A Zoroastrian by faith, Abadan won two consecutive elections to the Provincial Assembly of Balochistan in 1985 and 1988 from a seat reserved for non-Muslim minorities; he served as a Minister in the government. His wife, Nilofer, stood in the 1990 elections from the same seat but lost to Sanat Singh, a Sikh; in the next election, Abadan contested himself but lost to Singh. Nevertheless, he served as a special assistant to the two chief ministers — Jam Ghulam Qadir Khan and Zulfiqar Ali Khan Magsi — during these years.

Kidnapping 
On 17 February 2002, Abadan left his house to have dinner at a friend's place but never returned; he was believed to have been kidnapped, and his fate remains unknown. A decade later, in March 2011, his wife was abducted but returned after ten months on payment of 30 million PKR as ransom. The family has since shifted to Karachi.

References 

1946 births
Missing people